= Pentephyle =

Inland town of ancient Bithynia

Coordinates: 40°58′01″N 30°00′14″E

Pentephyle, also possibly known as Triknaita, was an inland town of ancient Bithynia inhabited during Roman times.

Its site is tentatively located near Gügüşler in Asiatic Turkey.
